Qualifying for the 2023 Rugby World Cup for European Rugby began in March 2021, where six teams compete for two direct qualification spots into the final tournament and for a place in the Final Qualification Tournament.

Format
The Rugby Europe Championship, controlled by Rugby Europe, is the regional qualification tournament for the 2023 Rugby World Cup in France. Each team play each other in a double-round-robin tournament over the two years, with the winners and runners-up of the two-year cycle qualifying for the World Cup as Europe 1 and Europe 2 respectively. The third placed team advances to the Final qualification tournament as Europe 3.

The qualification process did not include the remaining three divisions in the Rugby Europe system that are typically included across play-off matches due to the time scale restraints caused by the COVID-19 pandemic.

Entrants
Six teams competed during the European qualifiers for the 2023 Rugby World Cup; teams World Rankings are prior to the first European qualification matches on 6 March.

Rugby Europe Championship

Table
For the Rugby Europe Championship teams, results were considered on a 2-year aggregate from the 2021 and 2022 seasons; the winner and runner-up teams automatically qualified for the tournament as Europe 1 and Europe 2 individually, leaving the team in third place to qualify for the Final qualification tournament as Europe 3.

Following the Russian military invasion of Ukraine, Rugby Europe suspended all Russian games on home soil on 25 February 2022 before later suspending Russia at all levels with immediate effect on 1 March 2022. This later resulted in the cancelled games being declared a walkover and the opposition of Russia would be given 4 points.

Georgia were confirmed as Europe 1 following a walkover result against Russia whilst on 13 March, Spain had secured Europe 2 with a win over Portugal. However, on the 28 March, it was announced Spain would be investigated for fielding an ineligible player, the South Africa-born Gavin Van Den Berg, in two World Cup qualifying matches against the Netherlands. On 28 April 2022, an independent judicial committee determined that Spain did breach the regulation, and deducted 10 points from the table. This resulted in Spain dropping out of the top three qualifying/play-off places meaning Romania qualified as Europe 2 and Portugal would proceed to the play-offs. Spain later appealed the decision, but the appeal was unsuccessful and the original decision was upheld. This meant Romania qualified as Europe 2 and Portugal advancing to the play-offs as Europe 3.

Fixtures

2021

2022

 Georgia awarded 4 points.

 Netherlands awarded 4 points.

Portugal awarded 4 points.

See also
 2021 Rugby Europe Championship
 2022 Rugby Europe Championship

References

External links
 Rugby World Cup Official Site

European
2023
2020–21 in European rugby union
2021–22 in European rugby union